Empresa Nacional de Correios e Telégrafos de Angola, operating as Correios de Angola (CA), is the state-owned company responsible for postal service in Angola, founded in 1980.

External links

Communications in Angola
Companies of Angola
Angola
Philately of Angola